= 8 Nëntori =

Communist newspaper published in Albania

- Language: Albanian

8 Nëntori is a Communist newspaper published in Albania. Its name is the foundation date of the first Communist Party of Albania, on 8 November 1941.
